Cyanoboletus pulverulentus, commonly known as the ink stain bolete, is an edible bolete mushroom. It is found in deciduous and mixed forests, particularly on moist soil on slopes and under beech and oak trees. A common species, it is found in northern Asia, Europe, North Africa, Central and northern South America, and eastern North America. All parts of the mushroom will stain dark bluish-black after handling. A recent study has revealed this mushroom hyperaccumulates arsenic and therefore it's consumption should be limited.

Taxonomy

Boletus pulverulentus was first described by German mycologist Wilhelm Opatowski in 1836. The specific epithet pulverulentus means "covered with powder" and refers to the somewhat dry powdery surface of the young cap and stalk. The fungus was transferred to the newly created genus Cyanoboletus in 2014, where it is the type species. Based on the 28S rDNA, North American collection of this fungus reported in the Genbank database (accession number KF030313) does not match that from Europe.

Description
The flesh is yellow, with a mild taste and immediately turns blackish-blue when handled. The spore print colour is olive brown, and the stalk is long and slender, bright yellow to orange yellow at the top, and reddish-brown at the base. The mushrooms are edible, but not particularly desirable. Spores are smooth, fusoid (fuse shaped) to elliptical, and measure 11–15 by 4–6 µm. The basidia (spore-bearing cells) measure 22–35 by 6–9 µm. The cap cuticle comprises a tissue layer of undifferentiated hyphae measuring 3–7 µm wide.

Similar species
The eastern North American lookalike Boletus oliveisporus can be distinguished from C. pulverulentus by the pink to reddish colour in the center section of its stipe.

Habitat and distribution
An ectomycorrhizal species, Cyanoboletus pulverulentus forms associations with coniferous and deciduous trees, particularly oak. Fruit bodies appear on the ground, usually singly, in woodland. The bolete is widely distributed, having been reported from northern Asia, Europe, North Africa, Central and northern South America, and eastern North America. Reports of appearances in western North American could refer to the similar Cyanoboletus rainsii, which stains greenish-black instead of bluish-black.

See also
List of North American boletes

References

External links

Boletaceae
Edible fungi
Fungi described in 1836
Fungi of Africa
Fungi of Asia
Fungi of Central America
Fungi of Europe
Fungi of South America